Madeline S. "Maddie" Rooney (born July 7, 1997) is an American ice hockey player currently with the Professional Women's Hockey Players Association (PWHPA) and the U.S. national team. She was the starting goaltender as the U.S. won the gold medal at the 2018 Winter Olympics.

Early life and education
Rooney was born on July 7, 1997, in Duluth, Minnesota. She attended Andover High School.  In her senior year of high school, Rooney switched from the girls to the boys varsity team and finished the season with a .910 save percentage.

Rooney has a degree in business marketing from the University of Minnesota Duluth.

Career

University 
Rooney played for the Minnesota Duluth Bulldogs women's ice hockey program in the Western Collegiate Hockey Association (WCHA) conference as part of the NCAA Division I ice hockey league. In her second year, she compiled a save percentage of .942 and a goals against average of 1.65, good for fourth-best and tenth-best in the NCAA, respectively. She was awarded the 2018 Bob Allen Women's Player of the Year Award.

Professional 

After graduating, Rooney joined the PWHPA for the 2020–21 season.

International play 
At the age of 19, Rooney won a gold medal at the 2017 IIHF Women's World Championship as a backup goaltender. She recorded a shutout in her only game of the tournament, which came against  in the preliminary round. In 2018, she was again selected to play for the U.S. women's national ice hockey team at the Winter Olympics in Pyeongchang. Rooney started all but one of the games in the competition, losing only one game to Canada during the round robin. She helped lead Team USA to the gold medal by winning the shootout in the final against Canada by a score of 3–2, stopping Meghan Agosta in the sixth and last round to end the game. It was the United States' first gold medal at the Olympics since 1998, ending the Canadians' streak of four consecutive Olympic championships.

On January 2, 2022, Rooney was named to Team USA's roster to represent the United States at the 2022 Winter Olympics.

References

External links

1997 births
Living people
American women's ice hockey goaltenders
Ice hockey people from Duluth, Minnesota
Ice hockey players at the 2018 Winter Olympics
Ice hockey players at the 2022 Winter Olympics
Medalists at the 2018 Winter Olympics
Medalists at the 2022 Winter Olympics
Minnesota Duluth Bulldogs women's ice hockey players
Olympic gold medalists for the United States in ice hockey
Olympic silver medalists for the United States in ice hockey
Professional Women's Hockey Players Association players